Mario del Tránsito Soto Benavides (born July 10, 1950) is a Chilean former football defender who played as a centre back.

Career
Soto played for his native country in the 1982 FIFA World Cup. In total for his country he played 48 matches scoring 1 goal between 1975 and 1985. 

Soto is one of the biggest idols of Chilean club Cobreloa.

He also played for club football for Chileans CD Magallanes and Unión Española, and Brazilian side Palmeiras.

Honours
Unión Española
 Chilean Primera División (1): 1975

Cobreloa
 Chilean Primera División (3): 1980, 1982, 1985

Lozapenco
 Chilean Tercera División (1):

References

External links
 
 Mario Soto at MemoriaWanderers 
 Mario Soto at PlaymakerStats
 Mario Soto at PartidosdeLaRoja 

1950 births
Living people
Footballers from Santiago
Chilean footballers
Chilean expatriate footballers
Chile international footballers
Chilean Primera División players
Deportes Magallanes footballers
Unión Española footballers
Cobreloa footballers
Deportes Concepción (Chile) footballers
Audax Italiano footballers
Magallanes footballers
Campeonato Brasileiro Série A players
Sociedade Esportiva Palmeiras players
Tercera División de Chile players 
1982 FIFA World Cup players
1975 Copa América players
1979 Copa América players
Chilean expatriate sportspeople in Brazil
Expatriate footballers in Brazil
Association football defenders
Chilean football managers
Unión San Felipe managers
Santiago Wanderers managers
Cobreloa managers
Chilean Primera División managers